Viverravinae ("ancestors of viverrids") is an extinct subfamily of mammals from extinct family Viverravidae, that lived from the early Palaeocene to the middle Eocene in North America, Asia and Europe.

Classification and phylogeny

Classification
 Subfamily: †Viverravinae 
 Genus: †Simpsonictis 
 †Simpsonictis jaynanneae 
 †Simpsonictis pegus 
 †Simpsonictis tenuis 
 Genus: †Viverravus 
 †Viverravus acutus 
 †Viverravus gracilis 
 †Viverravus lawsoni 
 †Viverravus laytoni 
 †Viverravus lutosus 
 †Viverravus minutus 
 †Viverravus politus 
 †Viverravus rosei 
 †Viverravus sicarius 
 †Viverravus sp. [V11141] 
 †Viverravus sp. [Locality Group 2, Washakie Basin, Wyoming] 
 Genus: †Viverriscus 
 †Viverriscus omnivorus

Phylogeny
The phylogenetic relationships of subfamily Viverravinae are shown in the following cladogram:

See also
 Mammal classification
 Viverravidae

References

Viverravids
Paleocene first appearances
Eocene extinctions
Mammal subfamilies